Sovinja Peč (in older sources also Sovina Peč and Savinja Peč) is a small dispersed settlement in the hills immediately south of the Črnivec Pass in the Municipality of Kamnik in the Upper Carniola region of Slovenia.

Name

The name Sovinja Peč is derived from the surname Sovina and literally means 'Sovina cliff'. The designation "cliff" refers to Sovina Peak, which rises north of the village. The older spelling Savinja Peč, along with German Sawinapetsch, shows pretonic akanje. The surname Sovina is probably derived from the personal name Sova, originally used as a nickname based on the common noun sova 'owl'.

References

External links

Sovinja Peč on Geopedia

Populated places in the Municipality of Kamnik